The Hunter 28.5 is an American sailboat that was designed by the Hunter Design Team and first built in 1985.

The Hunter 28.5 was developed into the Hunter 28 in 1989.

Production
The design was built by Hunter Marine in the United States between 1985 and 1988, but it is now out of production.

Design

The Hunter 28.5 is a recreational keelboat, built predominantly of fiberglass, with wood trim. It is a B&R rigged sloop with a split backstay, with a raked stem, a reverse transom, an internally-mounted spade-type rudder controlled by a wheel and a fixed fin keel or shoal draft wing keel. The fin keel version displaces  and carries  of ballast, while the wing keel version displaces  and carries  of ballast.

The boat is fitted with an inboard diesel engine.

The factory-supplied standard equipment included a 110% genoa, two self-tailing two-speed jib sheet winches, double lifelines, a teak and holly cabin sole, dinette table, navigation table, stainless steel sink, hot and cold pressurized water system, a two-burner stove, an icebox, an anchor and life jackets. A spinnaker was a factory option.

The wing keel version has a PHRF racing average handicap of 180 with a high of 192 and low of 171.

See also

List of sailing boat types

Similar sailboats
Alerion Express 28
Aloha 28
Beneteau First 285
Cal 28
Catalina 28
Cumulus 28
Grampian 28
Hunter 28
J/28
O'Day 28
Pearson 28
Sabre 28
Sea Sprite 27
Sirius 28
Tanzer 28
TES 28 Magnam
Viking 28

References

External links

Official brochure

Keelboats
1980s sailboat type designs
Sailing yachts
Sailboat type designs by Hunter Design Team
Sailboat types built by Hunter Marine